Mission Earth is an album adaption of the novel series of the same name by Edgar Winter with words and music written by Scientology founder L. Ron Hubbard.

Production
L. Ron Hubbard left detailed instructions and audio tapes for the musicians and producers to follow when making this album, which was released posthumously for Hubbard. Edgar described Mission Earth as "both a return to rock’s primal roots and yet highly experimental". Winter had glowing words for Hubbard when he wrote, "Ron's technical insight of the recording process was outstanding." Winter also described Hubbard's delineation of counter-rhythm in rock as something "which was nothing short of phenomenal, particularly inasmuch as it had then been entirely unexplored and only later heard in the African-based rhythms of Paul Simon's work, some five years after Ron’s analysis."

Album cover
The science fiction cover artwork for the album and cassette tape feature a blond man, resembling Winter, floating in the clouds behind an iron fist that appears to be holding a representation of the Earth. The iron fist graphic also appears on the cover of Mission Earth, the novel. The background includes a night sky. The words on the album include "Edgar Winter" written in a futuristic-looking font and the words "Mission Earth", written in a cursive script. Some versions of the album were sold with a gold foil sticker that said, "Words and Music by L. Ron Hubbard".

Release
This album was published by Revenimus Music Publishing, the music publishing division of the Church of Scientology, which also published the album The Road to Freedom, which was also written by L. Ron Hubbard, but performed by various artists. It was issued by Rhino Entertainment.

The album was predicted to sell 800,000 copies by Rhino Entertainment, however, it probably sold poorly due to the lack of any public interest in Mission Earth as well as Hubbard's infamous status likely swaying away anyone who wanted to buy the album.

Track listing

Personnel
Edgar Winter – soprano, alto, and tenor saxophones, sampler, keyboards, vocals
Rick Cruzen – synthesizers, sound effects
Ron Miscavige – trumpet, cornet
Tamia Arbuckle – bass, guitar, sound effects
Charlie Rush – sequencing, percussion, sound effects
Barry Stein – Hammond B3 organ, accordion, vocals
Additional personnel
Pavel Farkas – first violin
David Campbell – viola
John Walz – cello
Bob Peterson – violin
Vladimir Polimatidi – violin
Bob Becker – viola
Peter Schless – programming, sequencing ("Planet Earth")
Ali Darwich – Turkish tabla drums
Kotto Gabal – Turkish tambourine
Monique Winter – vocals ("Just a Kid")
Margie Nelson – vocals ("Teach Me")
Steve Ambrose – vocals ("The Spacer's Lot")
Bo Tomlyn – programming

See also 

 Space Jazz
 The Road to Freedom

References 

1986 soundtrack albums
Albums published posthumously
Music based on novels
Edgar Winter albums
L. Ron Hubbard albums
Music based on science fiction works
Science fiction concept albums
Rhino Records albums